Tin(IV) bromide is the chemical compound SnBr4. It is a colourless low melting solid. 
SnBr4 can be prepared by reaction of the elements at normal temperatures:
Sn + 2Br2 → SnBr4
In aqueous solution Sn(H2O)64+ is the principal ionic species amongst a range of 6 coordinate ions with from 0-6 bromide ligands (e.g. Sn(H2O)64+, SnBr(H2O)53+); in basic solution the Sn(OH)62− ion is present.

SnBr4 forms 1:1 and 1:2 complexes with ligands, e.g. with trimethylphosphine the following can be produced, SnBr4.P(CH3)3 and SnBr4.2P(CH3)3.

SnBr4 crystallises in a monoclinic form with molecular SnBr4 units that have distorted tetrahedral geometry, with mean Sn-Br bond lengths of 242.3 pm.

References

Bromides
Metal halides
Tin(IV) compounds